Itha Samayamayi is a 1987 Indian Malayalam film, directed by P. G. Vishwambharan. The film stars Jagathy Sreekumar, Ratheesh, Jayaram and Karamana Janardanan Nair in the lead roles. The film has musical score by Shyam. The film is loosely based on the incident of police atrocities in Thankamany village in Kerala state.

Cast
Ratheesh as Sunny
Shari as Leelamma
Jagathy Sreekumar as Pirivu Antony
Karamana Janardanan Nair as Paramanandan Pilla
Ragini (New) as Susamma
Innocent as LIC Pathrose
M. G. Soman as Priest
Kunjandi as Panchayat President
Bahadoor as Paulose
Thrissur Elsy as Claramma
Kunchan as Pappan 
Valsala Menon as Jagathamma
Prathapachandran as Mathai
Rohini as Alice
Meena as Sunny's mother
Janardhanan as MLA Vattappara
Bheeman Raghu as Thampi
Kundara Johny as Johny

Soundtrack
The music was composed by Shyam and the lyrics were written by Shibu Chakravarthy.

References

External links
 

1987 films
1980s Malayalam-language films
Films directed by P. G. Viswambharan